The Rural Municipality of Cut Knife No. 439 is a rural municipality (RM) in the Canadian province of Saskatchewan within Census Division No. 13 and  Division No. 6.

History 
The RM of Cut Knife No. 439 incorporated as a rural municipality on December 13, 1909.

Geography

Communities and localities 
The following urban municipalities are surrounded by the RM.

Towns
 Cut Knife

The following unincorporated communities are within the RM.

Special service areas
 Rockhaven (dissolved as a village, December 31, 2007)

Localities
 Cutoff Junction
 Gallivan
 Rosemound
 Tatsfield
 Wilbert

Demographics 

Attractions 
 Clayton McLain Memorial Museum
 World's Largest Tomahawk
 Chief Poundmaker Historical Center
 Atton Lake Regional Park
 Table Mountain Regional Park

Government 
The RM of Cut Knife No. 439 is governed by an elected municipal council and an appointed administrator that meets on the second Wednesday of every month. The reeve of the RM is Brett Robertson while its administrator is Don McCallum. The RM's office is located in Cut Knife.

Transportation 
 Saskatchewan Highway 21
 Saskatchewan Highway 40
 Saskatchewan Highway 674
 Canadian Pacific Railway
 Cut Knife Airport

See also 
List of rural municipalities in Saskatchewan

References 

C

Division No. 13, Saskatchewan